E94 can refer to:
 European route E94, a road
 Orthodox variation of the King's Indian Defence, Encyclopaedia of Chess Openings code
 Kitasen Road, route E94 in Japan